Bradi (also written as Burady) is a village and municipality in the Lerik Rayon of Azerbaijan. It has a population of 155.   The municipality consists of the villages of Aşağı Bradi ("Lower Bradi") and Yuxarı Bradi ("Upper Bradi").

References

Populated places in Lerik District